Chase the Sun is the third album released by The O.C. Supertones. This is the only album to include Brian Johnson, whose spot was filled by Ethan Luck.

Track listing
Lyrics by Matt Morginsky except where noted. Music by Matt Morginsky, Tony Terusa and the O.C. Supertones except where noted.
"One Voice" - 2:57
"Hallelujah" (lyrics and music: Frederick Hibbert) - 3:40
"In Between" - 3:07
"Away from You"  featuring Crystal Lewis - 4:39
"Dedication" - 3:59
"Grounded" - 3:44
"Sure Shot" - 2:46
"Old Friend" (lyrics: Darren Mettler, Tony Terusa) - 3:31
"Chase the Sun" - 2:51
"Fade Away" - 4:16
"Hanani" - 3:59
"Revolution" [instrumental] - 3:20
"Health and Wealth" - 3:31
"Refuge" (in conclusion) - 2:01

Personnel 

The O.C. Supertones
 Matt "Mojo" Morginsky – lead vocals, arrangements 
 Brian Johnson – guitars, arrangements
 Tony Terusa – bass, arrangements
 Jason Carson – drums
 Daniel Spencer – trombone
 Darren Mettler – trumpet

Additional musicians
 Andrew Degrasse – keyboards, backing vocals 
 John Nau – keyboards 
 Andrew Bray – guitars, backing vocals 
 Frank Lenz – drums 
 Chris Trujillo – percussion 
 Dave Chevalier – saxophones, backing vocals 
 Finn Manniche – cello 
 Mellow D – backing vocals 
 Crystal Lewis – harmony vocals (4)
 The Gospel Singers (Benita Brisco, Mirata Dias and Jimmy Fisher) – backing vocals 

Production
 Garth "Gggarth" Richardson – producer 
 Brandon Ebel – executive producer 
 Darren Grahn – engineer at Sound City Studios, Los Angeles, California
 Nick Raskulinecz – recording assistant 
 Jim Rondonelli – mixing at The Warehouse Studio, Vancouver, Canada
 Dean Maher – mix assistant
 Greg Calbi – mastering at Sterling Sound, New York City
 Suzy Hutchinson – art direction
 Barry E. Eames – design
 Chisae Shinomiya – design
 Vern Evans – photography
 Anthony Saint James – photography

References

1999 albums
The O.C. Supertones albums